The 2022–23 UConn Huskies men's ice hockey season is the 63rd season of play for the program, the 25th at the Division I level, and the 9th in the Hockey East conference. The Huskies represent the University of Connecticut and are coached by Mike Cavanaugh, in his tenth season.

Season

Departures

Recruiting

Roster
As of September 12, 2022.

Standings

Schedule and results

|-
!colspan=12 style=";" | Regular Season

|-
!colspan=12 ! style=""; | 

|-
!colspan=12 style=";" |

Scoring statistics

Goaltending statistics

Rankings

USCHO did not release a poll in weeks 1 and 13.

References

2022-23
2022–23 Hockey East men's ice hockey season
2022–23 NCAA Division I men's ice hockey by team
2023 in sports in Connecticut
2022 in sports in Connecticut